MIL-W-46374 is a specification first published on October 30, 1964, for US military watches.  The 46374 was specified as an accurate, disposable watch. In its span, it encompassed metal and  plastic cased watches with both mechanical and quartz movements. The 46374 replaced the MIL-W-3818, reducing cost and inheriting the dial from the MIL-W-3818B. These were lower quality watches than the 15 jewel movements, the transition started as US involvement in Vietnam ramped up.

Revision A was released in 1968. Regarding Revision B from 1976, it "added radiation symbols to the dial, indicating that the luminous markers were radioactive, H3 for tritium.  Revision D (1986) expanded the scope of the specification to encompass a wider range of watches."

Pilots, divers, and other specialties continue to have military watches available for issue.

Dial font
In 1957 the DOD released MIL-C-18012A, a specification detailing the legibility of numerical displays for aircraft dials and readouts, and updated it with MIL-C-18012B in 1964.  At the same time as 18012B was released, so was 46374.  The font 46374 inherited from W3818B is unique, "It borrows elements from the super legible Futura and Gothic style fonts of the day but it is mostly influenced by the numerical font shown in MIL-C-18012A (This font itself borrowed heavily from the Grotesk fonts of the 1920s - later known as the German DIN fonts of the 1970s). Look particularly at the flat-topped "3" and the simple geometric shapes of the other numbers. Although the numbers used on the watches (both MIL-W-46374 and the earlier MIL-W-3818B) are more rounded and bolder, the only significant departure the watch designers seem to have taken is with the "9" and "6" which have rounded and more curved tails." Uncluttered, legible dial designs like the Waltham A-13, and the Chelsea Army Message Center Clock (Mark I) inspired the US Army’s Frankford Arsenal in Philadelphia who created the dial specifications and designs, and "The minute hand in the Mark I Chelsea seems to have lent a strong influence to the hand designs used in MIL-W-3818B watches."

Revisions

A
 September 1968
 Manufactured by: Benrus, Hamilton, Westclox
 Case Materials: Stainless Steel, Corrosion resistant steel, Plastic

B
 May 7, 1975
 Tritium luminous paint on the dial and hands
 Acrylic crystal
 7 Jewels
 Nylon strap with black anodized steel buckle
 Only US military watch produced by Timex
 Hamilton
 Stocker and Yale 184
 Marathon 359
 First to have "Dispose Rad. Waste" on caseback
 Clear coating on luminous painted hands to prevent the luminous paint from flaking off
 Watchband bars required to be integral or fixed, and excluded springbars
 Only Timex made B type watches with a plastic case
 Type II MIL-S-46383B strap

C
 April 15, 1983
 Larger plastic case
 Manufactured by Stocker AND Yale (S and Y, SandY)
 Quote: "The most significant changes in the new spec were a tightening of the standards for magnetism, vibration, and water resistance and some refinements to the "Dark Viewing" requirement."

D
 October 10, 1986
 Type 1: 15 jewels, plastic case, first 46374 to be maintainable, accuracy +-30 seconds a day
 Type 2: usu. 7 jewels, usu. plastic case accuracy +- 60 seconds a day
 First 46374 with a Quartz movement, Types 3, 4, 5
 Type 3: accuracy .7 secs a day, battery installed
 Type 4: As Type 3, battery in box
 Type 5: As Type 3, battery not included
 Manufactured by Hamilton, Marathon, Stocker and Yale

E
 May 31, 1989
 Because of high radiation emission from painted tritium luminous, the luminous was replaced with hermetically sealed tritium vials surrounding the outside of the dial, and on the hands
 New dial with serif style font
 Quote: "In addition to the dial layout changes the "E" revision calls for interchangeability of all parts on Type I watches on the same model from the same maker. The requirement of less than 25 milliCuries of radioactive emission from the watch face was also added to this specification."

F
 October 1991
 Added the Type 6 quartz Navigator for pilots with a function allowing the easy synchronization of multiple watches, and a rotating bezel.
 Stocker & Yale 650, 660
 Marathon 211
 Type I   - Analog, short life (2 years), non-maintainable, antimagnetic, water-resistant
 Type II  - Analog, long life (5–10 years), maintainable, antimagnetic, water-resistant, high altitude, corrosion-resistant
 Type III - Analog, long life (5–10 years), maintainable, antimagnetic, water-resistant, high altitude, corrosion-resistant, with elapsed time ring
 1.2.2  Classes.  The classes of wrist watches follow:  Class 1 - Electrical movement, battery installed
 Class 2 - Electrical movement, battery out of watch but packed with watch
 Class 3 - Electrical movement, battery not included with watch
 Class 4 - Mechanical movement, battery not required

G
 November 12, 1999
 renamed to MIL-PRF-46374

See also
US Military Watches

References

Additional sources
 DOD  MIL-PRF-46374 specification
 MIL-W-46374D A Major Expansion
 MIL-W-46374F  The Emergence of Marathon
 
 
 
 Hamilton Military Watches (MIL-W-46374)
 Marathon Navigator's Wrist Watch MIL-PRF-46374G

Watches
Watch models
Military of the United States standards